Castle Sowerby is a civil parish in the Eden District, Cumbria, England. It contains 19 buildings that are recorded in the National Heritage List for England. Of these, one is listed at Grade I, the highest of the three grades, two are at Grade II*, the middle grade, and the others are at Grade II, the lowest grade.  The parish is almost entirely rural, and most of the listed buildings are houses, farmhouses, and farm buildings scattered around the parish.  The other listed buildings are a church and a bridge.


Key

Buildings

References

Citations

Sources

Lists of listed buildings in Cumbria